In 2010, the CIS Nationals were staged at the Saville Sports Centre in Edmonton, Alberta.  The men's title was won by the surprise of the tournament, the Queen's Gaels skipped by Jon Beuk.  In the final the Gaels defeated the UPEI Panthers, skipped by former Canadian junior champion and world junior silver medalist, Brett Gallant.  In the women's final, the Regina Cougars took the title when skip Brooklyn Lemon drew the pin in an extra to defeat the St. Mary's Huskies.  This was the second consecutive runner up finish for SMU skip Marie Christianson. With their wins Queen's and Regina will represent Canada at the 2011 FISU Winter Universiade in Erzurum, Turkey.

Men's Results:

Tiebreaker 1: UPEI over Alberta

Tiebreaker 2: UPEI over Western

Semifinals: Queen's over Manitoba & UPEI over Dalhousie

Final: Queen's over UPEI

Queen's Gaels
Skip - Jonathan Beuk
Third - Andrew Inouye
Second - Chadd Vandermade
Lead - Scott Chadwick
Coach - Dick Henderson

Women's Results:

Tiebreaker: Waterloo over Alberta

Semifinals: St. Mary's over Waterloo & Regina over Laurier

Final: Regina over St. Mary's (EE)

Regina Cougars
Skip- Brooklyn Lemon
Third - Chelsey Peterson
Second - Ashley Green
Lead - Nicole Lang
Fifth - Sarah Watamanuk
Coach - Jackie Downer

See also
Curling
Canadian Curling Association
University and college curling
2011 Winter Universiade

CIS